Xiaocun may refer to the following locations in China:

 Xiaocun Station (肖村站), a station on the Yizhuang Line of the Beijing Subway
 Xiaocun, Shaanxi (小村镇), town in Wugong County
 Xiaocun, Zhejiang (筱村镇), town in Taishun County
 Xiaocun Township, Hebei (肖村乡), in Dingxing County
 Xiaocun Township, Hubei (小村乡), in Xianfeng County